Christian David Sprenger (born 19 December 1985) is an Australian former breaststroke swimmer. He trains at the Commercial Swimming Club under Simon Cusack.

Swimming career
At the 2008 Australian Swimming Championships he qualified in the 100- and 200-metre breaststroke, placing second in both events to qualify for the Olympics in Beijing. He failed to make the finals in either event but picked up a silver after swimming in the heats of the medley relay. Later on in the year he won nine individual FINA World Cup races during the 2008 series. He also won seven silvers and three bronze.

Sprenger had his first individual success at global level in 2009, breaking Kosuke Kitajima's world record in the semifinals of the 200m breaststroke, and took taking two bronze medals at the World Championships in Rome.

He had more international success in 2010, as he captured a silver in the 100-metre breaststroke at the 2010 Pan Pacific Swimming Championships and a bronze in the medley relay, along with 3 medals at the Commonwealth Games.

A career highlight, Sprenger won silver in the 100-metre breaststroke at the 2012 London Olympics with a new personal best of 58.93 seconds.

At the 2013 World Aquatics, Sprenger captured gold in the 100-metre breaststroke in a new personal best time. He also collected silver in the 50-metre breaststroke.

At the 2014 Commonwealth Games, he won a bronze medal in the men's 50 m breaststroke and was part of the Australian team that won the silver in men's 4 x 100 medley relay.

Personal life
Sprenger is of German descent. His cousin Nicholas Sprenger is a freestyler who represented Australia at the 2004 and 2008 Olympics.

Career Best Times
Sprenger has broken 2 world records in his career

See also
 List of Olympic medalists in swimming (men)
 World record progression 200 metres breaststroke

References

External links
 
 
 
 
 
 

1985 births
Living people
People from Queensland
Australian male breaststroke swimmers
Swimmers at the 2008 Summer Olympics
Swimmers at the 2012 Summer Olympics
Olympic swimmers of Australia
Olympic silver medalists for Australia
Olympic bronze medalists for Australia
Commercial Swimming Club swimmers
Australian people of German descent
World record setters in swimming
Swimmers at the 2006 Commonwealth Games
Swimmers at the 2010 Commonwealth Games
Commonwealth Games gold medallists for Australia
Commonwealth Games silver medallists for Australia
Commonwealth Games bronze medallists for Australia
Olympic bronze medalists in swimming
World Aquatics Championships medalists in swimming
Medalists at the 2012 Summer Olympics
Medalists at the 2008 Summer Olympics
Swimmers at the 2014 Commonwealth Games
Olympic silver medalists in swimming
Commonwealth Games medallists in swimming
Medallists at the 2006 Commonwealth Games
Medallists at the 2010 Commonwealth Games
Medallists at the 2014 Commonwealth Games